Lochburn railway station served the area of Maryhill, Glasgow, Scotland, from 1890 to 1917 on the Glasgow, Dumbarton and Helensburgh Railway.

History 
The station was opened on 1 May 1890 by the North British Railway. On the eastbound platform was the station building. To the southeast was the signal box, which opened in 1888. It controlled the sidings to Lochburn Iron Works, which was to the east. To the south was a siding which served Phoenix Chemical Works. This was later extended and the works became Kelvindale Chemical Works. There was also a siding behind the signal box. The station closed on 1 January 1917.

References

External links 
RAILSCOT - Lochburn

Former North British Railway stations
Railway stations in Great Britain opened in 1890
Railway stations in Great Britain closed in 1917
1890 establishments in Scotland
1928 disestablishments in Scotland
Maryhill